Lyncina ventriculus (ventral cowry) is a species of sea snail, a cowry, a marine gastropod mollusk in the family Cypraeidae, the cowries.

Description
The shape of these smooth and shiny shells is usually oval, the dorsum surface is generally reddish brown, with four dark brown transversal bands, while the sides are definitely chocolate brown and present several vertical thin lines. The base may be white, pale pink or pale brown, the aperture is long and narrow, with short teeth on both lips. The shell is quite similar to Lyncina schilderorum, Lyncina carneola and Lyncina sulcidentata. In the living cowries the mantle is dark-grey, with clearer sensorial papillae.

Distribution
This species is distributed  in the eastern Indian Ocean (Malaysia, Estern Indonesia, Cocos Islands and Christmas Island), in the Central and Western Pacific Ocean (South China Sea, Taiwan, Philippines, Samar Island, Guam, Melanesia, Solomon Islands, Micronesia, New Caledonia, eastern Polynesia, Tahiti and Hawaii).

Habitat

References
 Lorenz F. & Hubert A. (2000) A guide to worldwide cowries. Edition 2. Hackenheim: Conchbooks. 584 pp
 Burgess, C.M. (1970). The Living Cowries. AS Barnes and Co, Ltd. Cranbury, New Jersey

External links
 Biolib 
 Lyncina ventriculus
 Clade

Cypraeidae
Gastropods described in 1810